Douglas Vidal Jimenez is a Salvadoran retired footballer and manager.

In 2015, Vidal Jiménez was elected president of the Association of Football Coaches of El Salvador (AEFES), at a general assembly that the organization celebrated.

Jiménez explained that his arrival at the front of AEFES was due to the fact that together with other colleagues saw in the organization the possibility of making a change in national football.

References

External links
Douglas Vidal Jiménez at playmakerstats.com (English version of ogol.com.br)

Living people
Salvadoran footballers
Salvadoran football managers
Sportspeople from San Salvador
1968 births
Association footballers not categorized by position